Alexander Isley (born ) is an American graphic designer and educator.

Early life and education

Alexander Isley was born in Durham, North Carolina and studied at Durham Academy, the University of North Carolina School of the Arts (high school visual arts diploma). Isley initially wanted to become an architect like his father but discovered design upon enrolling in North Carolina State University, where he received a degree in Environmental Design. He later attended the Cooper Union School of Art in New York and received a BFA in graphic design.

In 1994, Isley married Veronica Burke.

Career
In 1984, Isley joined Tibor Kalman's influential M & Co. as senior designer. He held this position until 1987, when he joined Spy Magazine in 1987 as the first full-time art director. At Spy, he was tasked with building upon Steven Doyle's initial formatting and was awarded gold and silver medals from the Society of Publication Designers. In 1988, he founded Alexander Isley Inc. in New York City. In 1995, Isley moved the studio to Redding, Connecticut. The studio has worked on branding projects for Youth Service America, Armani Jeans and Goodwill, among others.

In 2004, Isley became the president of AIGA New York and an AIGA Fellow in 2013 after being a board member from 1988 to 1990.

In addition to his professional career, Isley taught Design and Typography at the School of Visual Arts from 1988 to 1990; Exhibit Design at the Cooper Union in 1992; and was a Critic and Lecturer at Yale from 1996 to 2011.

Honors and awards

 Terry Sanford Scholarship to the University of North Carolina School of the Arts, 1979
 Art Directors Club of New York Herb Lubalin Memorial Award, 1984
 National Endowment for the Arts International Design Education Fellowship, 1984
 "The I.D. 40" honoree: I.D. Magazine’s survey of the country's leading design innovators, 1990
 Federal Design Achievement Award
 Distinguished Alumnus, NC State University, 2000
 Permanent collection, Museum of Modern Art
 Permanent collection, Cooper-Hewitt, National Design Museum, Smithsonian Institution
 AIGA Fellow, 2013
AIGA Medal, 2014

Archives

The Alexander Isley Papers  at the Special Collections Research Center, North Carolina State University Libraries, Raleigh, covers Isley’s full career and includes initial concept explorations, original artwork, completed materials, and correspondence. An extensive selection of Isley’s poster designs are in the collection of the Museum of Design, Zürich.

Bibliography

 Bos, Ben and Bos, Elly. AGI: Graphic Design Since 1950, Thames and Hudson, 2007. 
 Friedl, Friedrich. Typography: When, Who, How, Konemann, 1998. 
 Friedman, Mildred. Graphic Design in America: A Visual Language History, Abrams/Walker Art Center, 1989. 
 Heller, Martin. Who’s Who in Graphic Design, Werd-Verlag, 1994.
 Heller, Steven. Graphic Wit: The Art of Humor in Design, Watson-Guptill, 1991. 
 Jackson, Kenneth T., ed. The Encyclopedia of New York City, Yale University Press, 1995. 
 Lupton, Ellen. Mixing Messages: Graphic Design in Contemporary Culture, Princeton Architectural Press, 1996. 
 Miller, R. Craig. U. S. Design: 1975-2000, Prestel-Verlag, 2001.

References

External links
 Company Web site
 Inside the Studio: Felt and Wire
 3 Questions with Alexander Isley
 Alex Isley Celebrates 25
 Alexander Isley Papers: NCSU Libraries Special Collections Research Center
 The Typography and Design of Alexander Isley

University of North Carolina School of the Arts alumni
North Carolina State University alumni
American graphic designers
Cooper Union alumni
American educators
AIGA medalists
People from New York (state)
People from Durham, North Carolina
1961 births
Living people